Melanchra is a genus of moths of the family Noctuidae.

Species
 Melanchra adjuncta (Boisduval, 1852)
 Melanchra assimilis (Morrison, 1874)
 Melanchra diabolica Plante, 1990
 Melanchra dierli Behounek, 1995
 Melanchra granti Warren, 1905
 Melanchra persicariae (Linnaeus, 1761) – Dot moth
 Melanchra picta (Harris, 1841) – Zebra caterpillar moth
 Melanchra postalba Sugi, 1982
 Melanchra pulverulenta (Smith, 1888)

References
Natural History Museum Lepidoptera genus database
Melanchra, funet.fi

 
Hadenini